The Berrien-Cass-St. Joseph (BCS) League is an athletic conference for high schools in southwest Michigan. Founded in 2014 with the inaugural season of play in 2014-15, the conference aspired to grow into a Southwest Michigan "super conference" with membership extending across all MHSAA classes and organized into divisions of schools with similar enrollments.  Periodic realignment of divisions allowed members to remain in competition with like-sized schools within the conference thereby avoiding the disruptive effects of conference switching due to changing enrollment.  The conference had a unique scheduling philosophy that did not force members to play against conference opponents in different divisions and respected the freedom of members to schedule rivals and other willing conference opponents regardless of size or division.

Between 2017 and 2021, the BCS experienced frequent membership changes with eight schools departing & five schools joining.  A final attempt to realize its "super-conference" aspiration was attempted in 2019, when membership invitations were extended to ten schools of diverse enrollments.  Niles and South Haven were the only two that accepted.  However, Niles departed after only a single season and South Haven exited after two seasons. When expansion proved unsuccessful, the remaining larger schools decided to leave for other conferences.  Beginning with the 2022-2023 season, the BCS transitioned into being a league catering to small public and private schools in southwest Michigan.

Sponsored Sports

Boys
Baseball, Basketball, Cross Country, Golf, Soccer, Tennis, Track and Field, Wrestling

Girls
Basketball, Cross Country, Soccer, Softball, Tennis, Track & Field, Volleyball

Member schools
There are currently 9 member schools.  The geographic footprint of the league includes Berrien, Cass, Kalamazoo, St. Joseph and Van Buren counties in Michigan.

Current members
School data in the table below is current for the 2022-23 season according to the MHSAA website.

†  8-man football team that is a member of the Southwest Michigan 8-man Football League

Former members

Membership Timeline

League championships

Baseball

Boys Basketball

Girls Basketball

Football

Softball

Volleyball

State championships
Schools that have participated in MHSAA state championship finals while being members of the BCS League.

References

Michigan high school sports conferences
High school sports conferences and leagues in the United States